Śrāvaka (Sanskrit) or Sāvaka (Pali) means "hearer" or, more generally, "disciple". This term is used in Buddhism and Jainism. In Jainism, a śrāvaka is any lay Jain so the term śrāvaka has been used for the Jain community itself (for example see Sarak and Sarawagi). Śrāvakācāras are the lay conduct outlined within the treaties by Śvetāmbara or Digambara mendicants. "In parallel to the prescriptive texts, Jain religious teachers have written a number of stories to illustrate vows in practice and produced a rich répertoire of characters.".

In Buddhism, the term is sometimes reserved for distinguished disciples of the Buddha.

Buddhism

Early Buddhism

In early Buddhism, a śrāvaka or śrāvikā is a disciple who accepts:
 the Buddha as their teacher
 the Buddha's teaching (the Dhamma), including understanding the Four Noble Truths, ridding oneself of the unreality of the phenomenal, and pursuing nirvana. See, for instance, the Anguttara Nikayas second Metta Sutta (AN 4.126) when, taken in consideration of the first "Metta Sutta" (AN 4.125), a disciple is described as one who "regards whatever phenomena there that are connected with form, feeling, perception, fabrications, & consciousness, as inconstant, stressful, a disease, a cancer, an arrow, painful, an affliction, alien, a disintegration, an emptiness, not-self."
 the community rules of conduct: the Five Precepts for laypersons, the prātimokṣa for monastics.
In the Nikāya, depending on the context, a sāvaka can also refer to a disciple of a teacher other than the Buddha.

Theravada Buddhism 

In Theravada Buddhism, a śrāvaka or śrāvikāt refers to one who followed in the tradition of the senior monks of the first Buddhist sangha and community. In the Pāli Canon, the term "disciple" transcends monastic-lay divisions and can refer to anyone from the following "four assemblies":
 bhikkhus ("monks")
 s ("nuns")
 upāsakas and upāsikā (laypersons of both sexes)

Buddhist texts further mention four types of disciples based on spiritual accomplishment:
 "Chief Disciple" (Pāli: aggasāvaka; Sanskrit: agraśrāvaka): in the Pali canon, these are Sāriputta and (Mahā)moggallāna
 "Foremost Disciple" (Pāli: etadaggasāvaka; Sanskrit: etadagraśrāvaka): referring to those disciples who are recognized as the best in their respective attribute
 "Great Disciple" (Pāli: mahāsāvaka; Sanskrit: mahāśrāvaka): examples are Mahākassapa, Ānanda, Anuruddha and Mahākaccāna.
 "Ordinary Disciple" (Pāli: pakatisāvaka;): constituting the majority of disciples, while devoted to the Buddha and his teaching and while having planted seeds for future liberation, they have not yet irreversibly entered the path to emancipation and are still subject to infinite rebirths.

Ariyasāvaka
In the Pali commentaries, the term ariyasāvaka is explained as "the disciple of the Noble One (i.e. Buddha)". Accordingly, Soma Thera and Thanissaro Bhikkhu translate this term as "The disciple of the Noble Ones"

However Bhikkhu Bodhi interprets this term as "noble disciple", and according to him, in the Pali suttas, this term is used in two ways:
 broadly: any lay disciple of the Buddha;
 narrowly: one who is at least on the path to enlightenment (Pāli: sotāpatti maggattha). In this sense, "ordinary people" (puthujjana) can be contrasted with this narrow definition of "noble disciple" (ariyasāvaka). Nyanatiloka writes, "sāvaka [...] refers, in a restricted sense (then mostly ariya-sāvaka, 'noble disciple'), only to the eight kinds of noble disciples (ariya-puggala, q.v.)."

The canon occasionally references the "four pairs" and "eight types" of disciples. This refers to disciples who have achieved one of the four stages of enlightenment:
 Sotāpanna
 Sakadāgāmin
 Anāgāmin
 Arahat

In regards to disciples achieving arahantship, Bhikkhu Bodhi writes:

For each of these stages, there is a "pair" of possible disciples: one who is on the stage's path (Pāli: magga); the other who has achieved its fruit (Pāli: phala). Thus, each stage represents a "pair" of individuals: the path traveler (Pāli: maggattha) and the fruit achiever (Pāli: phalattha). Hence, the community of disciples is said to be composed of four pairs or eight types of individuals (Pāli: cattāri purisayugāni attha purisapuggalā).

Foremost disciples
In the "Etadaggavagga" ("These are the Foremost Chapter," AN 1.188-267), the Buddha identifies 80 different categories for his "foremost" (Pāli: etadagga) disciples: 47 categories for monks, 13 for nuns, ten for laymen and ten for laywomen.

While the disciples identified with these categories are declared to be the Buddha's "foremost" or "chief" (Pāli: etadagga), this is different from his "Chief Disciples" (Pāli: aggasāvaka) who are consistently identified solely as Sāriputta and Mahāmoggallāna.

In addition, in SN 17.23, SN 17.24 and AN 4.18.6, the Buddha identifies four pairs of disciples "who have no compare" and who should thus be emulated.  These four pairs are a subset of the 80 foremost disciples listed above, identified in the sub-section 14 of AN 1 (i.e. AN 1.188-267). These four pairs of disciples to be most emulated are:

 monks: Sāriputta and Mahāmoggallāna
 nuns: Khemā and Uppalavaṇṇā
 laymen: Citta and Hatthaka of Alavi
 laywomen: Kujjuttara and Veḷukaṇḍakiyā

The community of disciples 
In Buddhism, there are two main communities (Pāli: sangha): 
 The "community of monks and nuns" (Pāli: bhikkhu-sangha; bhikkhuni-sangha) refers to a community of four or more monks or nuns who are living in a permanent or semi-permanent single-sex community (in the contemporary West monks and nuns may live within the same monastery but in separate living quarters). Within this community of monks and nuns there is a further sub-division containing practitioners (who are nonetheless still living among their fellow renunciates) possessed of some substantive level of realization (namely, those who have at least gained stream-entry). This core group is called the "noble sangha" (ariya-sangha).
 The "community of disciples" (Pāli: sāvaka-sangha) refers to the broad community of monks, nuns, and male and female layfollowers.

For an example of a traditional stock reference to the sāvaka-sangha in the Pali canon, in "The Crest of the Standard" discourse (SN 11.3), the Buddha advises his monks that, if they experience fear, they can recollect the Buddha or the Dhamma or the Sangha; and, in recollecting the Sangha they should recall:
 "The Sangha of the Blessed One's disciples  [sāvaka-sangha] is practising the good way, practising the straight way, practising the true way, practising the proper way; that is, the four pairs of persons, the eight types of individuals...."

A similar phrase can also be found in the lay disciple's daily chant, "Sangha Vandanā" ("Salutation to the Sangha").

Mahāyāna view 
In Mahayana Buddhism, śrāvakas or arhats are sometimes contrasted negatively with bodhisattvas. 

In the 4th century abhidharma work Abhidharmasamuccaya, Asaṅga describes those who follow the Śrāvakayāna. These people are described as having weak faculties, following the Śrāvaka Dharma, utilizing the Śrāvaka Piṭaka, being set on their own liberation, and cultivating detachment in order to attain liberation. Those in the Pratyekabuddhayāna are portrayed as also utilizing the Śrāvaka Piṭaka, are said to have medium faculties, to follow the Pratyekabuddha Dharma, and to be set on their own personal enlightenment. Finally, those in the Mahāyāna "Great Vehicle" are portrayed as utilizing the Bodhisattva Piṭaka, as having sharp faculties, following the Bodhisattva Dharma, and set on the perfection and liberation of all beings, and the attainment of complete enlightenment.

According to Vasubandhu's Yogacara teachings, there are four types of śrāvakas:
 The fixed
 The arrogant
 The transformed
 The converted (to "Bodhi" or Buddhism)

The transformed and the converted (Buddhist) are assured of eventual Nirvana in the Lotus Sutra.

According to Je Tsongkhapa, founder of the Gelug school of Tibetan Buddhism:

Jainism 

A śrāvaka in Jainism is a lay Jain. He is the hearer of discourses of monastics  and scholars, Jain literature. In Jainism, the Jain community is made up of four sections: monks, nuns, śrāvakas (laymen) and śrāvikās (laywomen).

The term śrāvaka has also been used as a shorthand for the community itself. For example, the Sarawagi are a Jain community originating in Rajasthan, and sometimes śrāvaka is the origin of surnames for Jain families. The long-isolated Jain community in East India is known as the Sarak.

The conduct of a śrāvaka is governed by texts called śrāvakācāras, the best known of which is the Ratnakaranda śrāvakācāra of Samantabhadra.

A śrāvaka rises spiritually through the eleven pratimas. After the eleventh step, he becomes a monk.

Jains follow six obligatory duties known as avashyakas: samayika (practising serenity), chaturvimshati (praising the tirthankara), vandan (respecting teachers and monks), pratikramana (introspection), kayotsarga (stillness), and pratyakhyana (renunciation).

See also
Sāvakabuddha
Śrāvakayāna
Arhat

Notes

Bibliography
 Acharya, Kala (2002). : A Glossary of Buddhist Terms. Mumbai, New Delhi:Somaiya Publications. . Available on-line at: http://ccbs.ntu.edu.tw/DBLM/resource/ebooks/102946/102946.htm.
  
 
 Bodhi, Bhikkhu (ed.) (2005). In the Buddha's Words: An Anthology of Discourses from the Pāli Canon.Boston: Wisdom Pubs. .
 
Hecker (2003) NO CITATION
 Indaratana Maha Thera, Elgiriye (2002). Vandana: The Album of Pali Devotional Chanting and Hymns. Penang, Malaysia:Mahindarama Dhamma Publication. Available on-line at: http://www.buddhanet.net/pdf_file/vandana02.pdf.
 
 
 Pali Text Society (PTS) (1921–1925). The Pali Text Society's Pali-English dictionary. London: Chipstead.  Available on-line at: http://dsal.uchicago.edu/dictionaries/pali/.
 Prayudh Payutto (1986). Sangha: The Ideal World Community. in 
 Thanissaro Bhikkhu (trans., 2006a). Metta Sutta: Good Will (1) (AN 4.125). Available on-line at: http://www.accesstoinsight.org/tipitaka/an/an04/an04.125.than.html.
 Thanissaro Bhikkhu (trans., 2006b). Metta Sutta: Good Will (2) (AN 4.126). Available on-line at: http://www.accesstoinsight.org/tipitaka/an/an04/an04.126.than.html.
 Thanissaro Bhikkhu (trans., 1997). Sabbasava Sutta: All the Fermentations (MN 2). Available on-line at: http://www.accesstoinsight.org/tipitaka/mn/mn.002.than.html.
 Uppalavanna, Sister (trans.) (n.d.-a). Aayācanāsuttam: Wishing (AN 4.18.6).  Retrieved from "MettaNet" at http://www.metta.lk/tipitaka/2Sutta-Pitaka/4Anguttara-Nikaya/Anguttara2/4-catukkanipata/018-sacetaniyavaggo-e.html.
 Uppalavanna, Sister (trans.) (n.d.-b). Etadaggavagga: These are the foremost (AN 1.14).  Retrieved from "MettaNet" at http://www.metta.lk/tipitaka/2Sutta-Pitaka/4Anguttara-Nikaya/Anguttara1/1-ekanipata/014-Etadaggapali-e.html.  A Romanized Pali version of this chapter is available from this same site at http://www.metta.lk/tipitaka/2Sutta-Pitaka/4Anguttara-Nikaya/Anguttara1/1-ekanipata/014-Etadaggapali-p.html.
 Webu Sayadaw & Roger Bischoff (trans.) (1995). "A Happiness that Ever Grows" in The Essential Practice (Part II).  Available on-line at: http://www.accesstoinsight.org/lib/authors/webu/wheel384.html#happy.

External links

Digital Dictionary of Buddhism (log in with userID "guest")

 
Buddhist titles